Mark Allan Marissen (born 1966 in St. Thomas, Ontario, Canada) is a Canadian political strategist and principal of Burrard Strategy Inc., a communications company he founded in 1998.  Marissen is also a senior advisor to McMillan Vantage Policy Group, affiliated with McMillan LLP, a Canadian business law firm.

Marissen was a candidate for mayor of Vancouver in the 2022 election. He was the candidate of Progress Vancouver, formerly known as Yes Vancouver. He placed fourth with 3.47% of the vote.

Marissen graduated from Carleton University with a bachelor's degree in political science, and also attended Simon Fraser University. Marissen resides in Vancouver, British Columbia, and has one child (Hamish Marissen-Clark) by his ex-wife, the 35th British Columbia Premier Christy Clark. Marissen's older brother is professor of music Michael Marissen.

Politics 
Following Dion's resignation, Marissen supported Michael Ignatieff for Liberal Party leader. Ignatieff was confirmed as Leader at a national convention in Vancouver in late April 2009. In the most recent federal Liberal leadership contest, Marissen was campaign manager for George Takach for Liberal Party leader. After Takach withdrew from the contest, Marissen joined him in supporting Justin Trudeau.

More recently, Marissen served as strategist for Michael Lee's campaign for the leadership of the BC Liberal Party, where Lee was 30 points short from being on the final ballot.

References

External links
"Politics 'in the Blood' for Liberal insider", National Post, October 6, 2008 
"Can party's shrewd B.C. strategist save Dion?" Vancouver Sun, October 4, 2007
BC Business: "On the Mark", June, 2007
"A West Coast Power Player", Vancouver Sun, January 6, 2007 
"Drug Raids Highlight Political Links", Globe and Mail, December 31, 2003

1966 births
Living people
Canadian political consultants
Carleton University alumni
People from St. Thomas, Ontario
Liberal Party of Canada